The Croatian National Badminton Championships is a tournament organized to crown the best badminton players in Croatia. They are held since 1992.

Past winners

References

External links
 Badminton Europe - Details of affiliated national organisations
 Hrvatski badmintonski savez - Results

Badminton tournaments in Croatia
National badminton championships
Recurring sporting events established in 1992
Sports competitions in Croatia
1992 establishments in Croatia